Lucky Stars is a Hong Kong action comedy film series in the 1980s and 1990s.

Lucky Stars can also refer to:

Lucky Stars (album), a 2015 album by Don McGlashan
The Lucky Stars, a 2005 Chinese TV drama series
"Lucky Stars" (song) by Dean Friedman, 1978

See also
Lucky Star (disambiguation)
Thank Your Lucky Stars (disambiguation)